Nawab Intizam-ul-Mulk Bahadur (died 16 May 1889) was the younger brother of Zahir-ud-Daula, the second Prince of Arcot. He succeeded his brother on his demise and ruled from 1879 to 1889.

Reign 

Intizam-ul-Mulk was the younger son of Azim Jah and the younger brother of Zahir-ud-Daula, the first and second Nawabs of Arcot. According to his father Azim Jah's wishes, Intizam-ul-Mulk succeeded Zahir-ud-Daula as Nawab in 1879.

Intizam-ul-Mulk reigned from 1879 to 1889. He was entitled to a 15-gun salute and was the last prince of Arcot to be exempted from appearance in civil courts.

References 

 

1889 deaths
Indian Muslims
Nawabs of India
Year of birth unknown